The Towton torcs are a pair of gold bracelets from Towton, North Yorkshire, England, dating from the later Iron Age.

Discovery
The torcs were found by metal detectorists in a stream in 2010 and 2011.

Description
Both torcs are gold alloys and formed from a twisted wire with looped terminals. The first torc discovered comprised a twisted wire of two strands, the second had four strands. The first torc measured  in diameter, weighed 67.7g. It had a metal content of 80-84% gold; 12-14% silver; and at least 4% copper.

Acquisition and display
After being declared as treasure, the Yorkshire Museum launched a public funding campaign to raise the £60,000 required to purchase the torcs. The torcs were acquired by the museum in November 2013.

References

External links
The Towton Torcs on Google Arts&Culture
Yorkshire Museum collection highlights: IRON AGE GOLD TORCS

2010 in England
Metal detecting finds in England
History of North Yorkshire
Collections of the Yorkshire Museum
Treasure troves in England
Archaeological sites in North Yorkshire
Treasure troves of the Iron Age
Torcs
Ancient Celtic metalwork
2010 archaeological discoveries
2011 archaeological discoveries